The 1972 Cardiff City Council election was held on Thursday 4 May 1972 to elect councillors to Cardiff City Council in Cardiff, Glamorgan, Wales. It took place on the same day as several other county borough elections in Wales and England.

The previous elections to this one were in May 1971. The 1972 election would be the final all-Cardiff election to this Council before the dissolution of the unitary authority and the creation of the new second-tier district authority of Cardiff City Council in 1974.  

The election saw the Labour Party taking a significant number of seats, to cut the Conservative Party majority.

Background
Cardiff County Borough Council had been created in 1889. Cardiff became a city in 1905. Elections to the local authority were held annually, though not all council seats were included in each contest, because each of the three councillors in each ward stood down for election in rotation. The councillors elected in 1972 would only serve for less two years, before the dissolution of the Council in April 1974.

There were a total of 76 seats on the Council, including 19 aldermen.

Overview of the result

Nineteen seats in 19 electoral wards were up for election in May 1972. The Labour Party won an additional ten seats on the Council, mainly from the ruling Conservative Party, cutting the Tory majority to 12. One of the gains was in the Whitchurch ward, which until last year had been a Tory stronghold.

Ward results
Contests for one ward councillor seat took place in each of the nineteen wards at this election.

Adamsdown

Canton

Cathays

Central

Ely

Gabalfa

Grangetown

Llandaff

Llanishen

Penylan

Plasmawr

Plasnewydd

Rhiwbina

Riverside

Roath

Rumney

South

Splott

Whitchurch

* = 'retiring' ward councillor for re-election

See also
 1973 Cardiff City Council election

References

Cardiff
Council elections in Cardiff
1970s in Cardiff